is a Japanese actor who is affiliated with Blue Shuttle. His blood type is O.

Biography
Matsuda joined the Himawari Theatre Group from his mother's recommendation, and was active in many commercials at a young age. In a motive of "necessary to examination of high school", he learned to dance from the time of his junior year for three years. Matsuda graduated from the theater department of Hyogo Takarazuka North High School, to learn performing arts at university.

In 2012, he debuted in the stage play, Musical Nintama Rantaro, as Monjiro Shioe. Matsuda played a colleague in the film, Nintama Rantaro Natsuyasumi Shukudai Dai sakusen! no Dan. The same year, he served in a main role for the stage play, Zero of the agency produced, and followed in Zero Fighter and Mibu Ro.

In 2013, Matsuda made regular appearances in Kamen Rider Gaim as Zack / Kamen Rider Knuckle.

Filmography

TV series

Films

References

External links
 Blue Shuttle profile 
 Official blog 
 
 

21st-century Japanese male actors
1992 births
Living people
Actors from Hyōgo Prefecture